The eighth season of the reality television series Love & Hip Hop: New York aired on VH1 from October 30, 2017 until March 12, 2018. The show was primarily filmed in New York City, New York. It is executively produced by Mona Scott-Young and Stephanie R. Gayle for Monami Entertainment, Toby Barraud, Stefan Springman, Mala Chapple, David DiGangi, and Lauren Veteri for Eastern TV, and Nina L. Diaz, Liz Fine and Vivian Gomez for VH1.

The series chronicles the lives of several women and men in the New York area, involved in hip hop music. It consists of 18 episodes, including a two-part reunion special hosted by Nina Parker.

Production

On October 3, 2017, VH1 announced that Love & Hip Hop would be returning for an eighth season on October 30, 2017. This season featured an entirely new opening credits sequence.  With the exception of Kimbella Vanderhee and Cardi B who left the show, all main cast members from the previous season returned. Cam'ron's fiancée Juju C. was promoted to the main cast, alongside newcomers Anaís and Lil' Mo. Karl Dargan, Safaree Samuels, Navarro Gray, his girlfriend Ashley Diaz, her sister Ayisha Diaz, rapper Jaquáe, video vixen Sophia Body, Bad Girls Club star DreamDoll, rapper Brittney Taylor, singer James R., K. Michelle: My Life cast member Jonathan Fernandez and singer Trent Crews would join the supporting cast. Grafh and Kiyanne would also appear in supporting roles. On October 20, 2017, a royalty-themed promo "Stay Queening'" was released, with Remy Ma introducing "the new queens of New York" - Lil' Mo, Anaís, Brittney Taylor and DreamDoll. On October 24, 2017, VH1 released a five-minute "super" trailer.

On October 18, 2017, nearly two weeks before the season eight premiere, VH1 aired Dirty Little Secrets, a special featuring unseen footage and deleted scenes from the show's first seven seasons, along with interviews with the show's cast and producers. On November 16, 2017, VH1 announced that Remy & Papoose: A Merry Mackie Holiday, a holiday special starring Remy Ma and Papoose, would air on December 18, 2017. On February 12, VH1 aired Love & Hip Hop: The Love Edition, a Valentine's Day special featuring clips from the show and interviews with cast members from all franchises.

Synopsis

Yandy's marriage becomes strained when her mother-in-law Judy starts to interfere with her business. Singer Anaís, frustrated by the state of her career and stuck in a miserable marriage, becomes recklessly flirtatious, culminating in a torrid affair with Rich. Safaree returns to New York looking for love. Mariahlynn's new man James R. creates new problems for her. Bianca's violent rivalry with fellow rapper Brittney Taylor threatens to derail both of their careers. Singer Lil' Mo and her husband, boxer Karl Dargan have the perfect marriage and family, but social media accusations might put all of it in jeporady.

Reception
This season was poorly received by viewers, with ratings dipping below 2 million viewers for the first time in four years. A scene featuring Yandy speaking into an apparently unplugged telephone was widely ridiculed and condemned as proof of the show's decline and reliance on increasingly fabricated storylines. Former cast member Erica Mena criticised the new cast and the season's storylines, particularly Yandy's, calling them "boring". Comedian KendallKyndall, who has recapped the show for years and hosted live streams and interviews for this season for VH1.com, also criticised the season's rushed and confusing editing, weak storylines and uninspiring casting.

Cast

Starring

 Yandy Smith-Harris (13 episodes)
 Bianca Bonnie (12 episodes)
 Mariahlynn (15 episodes)
 Juju C. (16 episodes)
 Anaís (17 episodes)
 Lil' Mo (8 episodes)
 Felicia "Snoop" Pearson (12 episodes)
 Remy Ma (14 episodes)

Also starring

 Papoose (12 episodes)
 DJ Self (17 episodes)
 Safaree Samuels (15 episodes)
 Rich Dollaz (14 episodes)
 Navarro Gray (12 episodes)
 Brittney Taylor (14 episodes)
 Judy Harris (4 episodes)
 Jaquáe (16 episodes)
 Jonathan Fernandez (15 episodes)
 James R. (9 episodes)
 Ashley Diaz (7 episodes)
 DreamDoll (14 episodes)
 Sophia Body (8 episodes)
 Karl Dargan (8 episodes)
 Grafh (5 episodes)
 Ayisha Diaz (4 episodes)
 Trent Crews (4 episodes)
 Kiyanne (9 episodes)
 Hennessy Carolina (1 episode)

DJ Webstar, Safaree's mother Shirley Samuels, Anaís' husband Ruben Brito, Rich's mother Jewel Escobar and Peter Gunz appear as guest stars in several episodes. Mendeecees Harris appears via phone call conversations with Yandy, as he was incarcerated during filming. The show also features minor appearances from notable figures within the hip hop industry and New York's social scene, including Dr. Jeff, Dr. Miami, Fetty Wap and Love & Hip Hop: Miamis Trina. Tara Wallace returns in an uncredited cameo appearance.

Episodes

Webisodes

Check Yourself
Love & Hip Hop New York: Check Yourself, which features the cast's reactions to each episode, was released weekly with every episode on digital platforms.

Bonus scenes
Deleted scenes from the season's episodes were released weekly as bonus content on VH1's official website.

Music
Several cast members had their music featured on the show and released singles to coincide with the airing of the episodes.

References

External links

2017 American television seasons
2018 American television seasons
Love & Hip Hop